Sertânia is a city  in the state of Pernambuco, Brazil. The population in 2020, according to the IBGE, was 36,050. Its total area is 2421.51 km².

Geography

 State - Pernambuco
 Region - Sertão Pernambucano
 Boundaries - Iguaraci and Paraiba state (N); Arcoverde, Buíque, Ibimirim and Tupanatinga (S);  Custódia   (W); Paraiba (E)
 Area - 2421.51 km²
 Elevation - 558 m
 Hydrography - Moxotó River
 Vegetation - Caatinga Hiperxerófila
 Climate - semi-arid, hot and dry
 Annual average temperature - 23.7 c
 Distance to Recife - 309 km

Economy

The main economic activities in Sertânia are based in industry, commerce and agribusiness, especially the raising of cattle, sheep (over 85,000), pigs, goats (over 120,000), horses, and donkeys; and plantations of corn, tomatoes and beans.

Economic indicators

Economy by sector
2006

Health indicators

References

Municipalities in Pernambuco